libavcodec is a free and open-source library of codecs for encoding and decoding video and audio data.

libavcodec is an integral part of many open-source multimedia applications and frameworks. The popular MPV, xine and VLC media players use it as their main, built-in decoding engine that enables playback of many audio and video formats on all supported platforms. It is also used by the ffdshow tryouts decoder as its primary decoding library. libavcodec is also used in video editing and transcoding applications like Avidemux, MEncoder or Kdenlive for both decoding and encoding.

libavcodec contains decoder and sometimes encoder implementations of several proprietary formats, including ones for which no public specification has been released. As such, a significant reverse engineering effort is part of libavcodec development. Having such codecs available within the standard libavcodec framework gives a number of benefits over using the original codecs, most notably increased portability, and in some cases also better performance, since libavcodec contains a standard library of highly optimized implementations of common building blocks, such as DCT and color space conversion. However, while libavcodec does strive to achieve decoding that is bit-exact to their official format implementations, occasional bugs and missing features in such re-implementations can sometimes introduce playback compatibility problems for certain files.

Implemented video codecs
libavcodec includes video decoders and/or encoders for the following formats, this list is not exhaustive:

 
 Animated GIF
 Asus video format v1 and v2
 AVS (decoding only, encoding through libxavs)
 AV1
 CamStudio format (decoding only)
 CineForm (decoding only)
 Cinepak
 Creative YUV (CYUV, decoding only)
 Dirac
 DNxHD
  Duck Corporation Truemotion 1, 2, and RT codecs (Decoding only)
 FFV1
 Flash Screen Video v1 and v2
 H.261
 H.262/MPEG-2 Part 2
 H.263
 H.264/MPEG-4 AVC (native decoder, encoding through x264 and hardware encoding)
 HEVC (native decoder, encoding through x265 and hardware encoding)
 Huffyuv
 id Software RoQ Video
 Indeo (decoding only)
 Lagarith (decoding only)
 MJPEG
 MPEG-1
 MPEG-4 Part 2 (the format used for example by the popular DivX and Xvid codecs)

 Apple ProRes
 QuickDraw (decoding only)
 QuickTime: Graphics (decoding only), Video (decoding only) and Animation (RLE)
 RealVideo RV10 and RV20
 RealVideo RV30 and RV40 (decoding only)
 SheerVideo (decoding only)
 Smacker video (decoding only)
 Snow
 Sorenson Spark under the name FLV1
 SVQ1
 SVQ3 (decoding only)
 Theora (native decoder, encoding through libtheora)
 TrueMotion v1 and v2 (decoding only)
 VC-1 (decoding only)
 Sierra VMD Video (decoding only)
 VMware VMnc (decoding only)
 VP3 (decoding only)
 VP5 (decoding only)
 VP6 (decoding only)
 VP7 (decoding only)
 VP8 (native decoder, encoding through libvpx)
 VP9 (native decoder, encoding through libvpx)
 VQA (decoding only)
 WMV version 7 and 8
 WMV version 9 (decoding only)
 Windows Media Video Image (decoding only)
 Windows Media Video Screen 1 and 2 (decoding only)
 Wing Commander/Xan Video (decoding only)

Implemented audio codecs
libavcodec includes decoders and encoders for the following formats:

 8SVX (decoding only)
 AAC
 AC-3
 AMR (decoding only)
 AMR-WB (decoding only)
 Apple Lossless
 ATRAC1, ATRAC3, ATRAC3plus and ATRAC9 (decoding only)
 Codec 2
 Cook Codec (decoding only)
 DTS (encoder is highly experimental)
 EA ADPCM (decoding only)
 E-AC-3
 EVRC (decoding only)
 FLAC
 G.711 (μ-law and A-law)
 G.722
 G.723.1
 G.726
 G.729 (decoding only)
 GSM 06.10 (native decoder, encoding through libgsm)
 Intel Music Coder and Indeo Audio Coder (decoding only)
 Meridian Lossless Packing / Dolby TrueHD

 Monkey's Audio (decoding only)
 MP1 (decoding only)
 MP2
 MP3 (native decoder, encoding through LAME)
 Nellymoser Asao Codec in Flash
 Opus (native encoder and decoder, encoding through libopus)
 QCELP (decoding only)
 QDM2 (decoding only)
 RealAudio 1.0
 RealAudio 2.0 (decoding only)
 Shorten (decoding only)
 Truespeech (decoding only)
 TTA
 TwinVQ (decoding only)
 Vorbis
 WavPack
 Windows Media Audio 1 and 2
 Windows Media Audio 9 Lossless (decoding only)
 Windows Media Audio 9 Professional (decoding only)
 Windows Media Audio Voice (decoding only)

Legal aspects 
Libavcodec contains more than 100 codecs, most of which do not just store uncompressed data. Most codecs that compress information could be claimed by patent holders. Such claims may be enforceable in countries like the United States which have implemented software patents, but are considered unenforceable or void in countries that have not implemented software patents.

Furthermore, many of these codecs are only released under terms that forbid reverse engineering, even for purposes of interoperability. These terms of use are forbidden in certain countries. For example, some European Union nations have not implemented software patents and have laws expressly allowing reverse engineering for purposes of interoperability.

Libraries that depend on libavcodec
 libavformat (part of FFmpeg)
 libgegl (optional part of GEGL)
 libgimp (part of GIMP)
 libmpcodecs (part of MPlayer)
 libmpdemux (part of MPlayer)

Applications using libavcodec

Video players
 FFplay
 MPlayer
 mpv
 MPC-HC and MPC-BE
 VLC
 xine

Audio players
 Audacious (Uses in audacious-plugins's ffaudio)
 Rockbox (Includes only FLAC code)
 XMMS2

Multimedia players
 Gnash
 Moonlight
 swfdec

Video editors
See also Comparison of video editing software
 Avidemux
 Cinelerra
 Kdenlive
 Kino

Audio editors
 Audacity (since 1.3.6)
 SoX (optional)

Video converters
 avconv
 FFmpeg
 HandBrake
 MEncoder
 SUPER

Video libraries
 GPAC
 Media Lovin' Toolkit

Optical disc authoring
 K3b

Graphic libraries
 GEGL
 ImageMagick

3D graphics editors
 Blender

VoIP
 Ekiga
 QuteCom
 Linphone

Multimedia streaming server
 FFserver
 VLC media player

Multimedia frameworks
 ffdshow (wraps libavcodec as a DirectShow filter and adds postprocessing to improve image quality; once installed, it is automatically used by all Windows DirectShow video players, such as Windows Media Player, Media Player Classic, Winamp etc. It also wraps libavcodec as a Video for Windows filter; the framework used by most video editing software.)
 LAV Filters
 GStreamer via the GStreamer FFmpeg plugin
 Perian
 Bellagio OpenMAX Integration Layer – open-source OpenMAX IL API implementation

Computer vision libraries
 OpenCV

Browser
 Google Chrome

Media center
 MythTV
 Plex
 Kodi (formerly XBMC)

Screen capture
 xvidcap

Device utilities
 BitPim – utilities for CDMA phones

CCTV
 ZoneMinder – video camera security suite
 Motion – video camera security/monitoring program

Games
 Performous – music game including singing, band and dance.
 StepMania
 Ultrastar
 osu!

Others
 CorePlayer
 FreeJ
 Ingex Studio – used by BBC
 PulseAudio – includes only resamplers code

References

Audio libraries
C (programming language) libraries
Free codecs
Free computer libraries
Video libraries
Free software programmed in C